Edgard Nandrasana (born 26 November 1981) is a retired Malagasy football midfielder.

References

1981 births
Living people
Malagasy footballers
Madagascar international footballers
AS Adema players
Association football midfielders